Frances 'Pamela' Mortimer (1932-2016) was a female international table tennis player from England.

Table tennis career
She represented England at the 1959 World Table Tennis Championships in the Corbillon Cup (women's team event) with Ann Haydon, Diane Rowe and Kathleen Best.

Personal life
She married Alan Lake in 1956 and died in 2016.

See also
 List of England players at the World Team Table Tennis Championships

References

English female table tennis players
1932 births
2016 deaths